Malcolm Stewart or Stuart may refer to:

Percy Malcolm Stewart (1872–1951), English industrialist and philanthropist
 Malcolm Stewart (actor) (born 1948), Canadian actor
 Malcolm Stewart (motorcyclist) (born 1992), American motocross racer
 Malcolm Stewart (footballer), Saint Vincent and the Grenadines footballer
 Malcolm Stewart, current deputy United States Solicitor General
 Max Stewart (Malcolm Clarke Stewart, 1935–1977), Australian racing driver

See also